This is the discography of American singer Thelma Houston.

Albums

Studio albums

Live albums

Compilation albums

Singles

Notes

References

Discographies of American artists
Rhythm and blues discographies
Soul music discographies
Disco discographies